Lieutenant General Charles George Norman Miles,  (10 November 1884 – 18 February 1958), commonly known as C.G.N. Miles, was a senior officer in the Australian Army during the Second World War. Miles was Commandant of the Royal Military College, Duntroon from 1935 to 1939 and Adjutant General from 1939 to 1940, before succeeding Lieutenant General Vernon Sturdee as General Officer Commanding Eastern Command in June 1940.

References

|-

1884 births
1958 deaths
Military personnel from Brisbane
Australian Companions of the Distinguished Service Order
Australian Companions of the Order of St Michael and St George
Australian generals
Australian military personnel of World War I
Australian Army personnel of World War II
Graduates of the Staff College, Camberley
People from Brisbane